Tore Hagebakken (born 8 January 1961, in Vestre Toten) is a Norwegian politician for the Labour Party.

He was elected to the Norwegian Parliament from Oppland in 2005. He had previously served in the position of deputy representative during the terms 1985–1989 and 1989–1993.

Between 2000 and 2001, during the first cabinet Stoltenberg, Hagebakken was appointed State Secretary in the Ministry of Health and Social Affairs.

Hagebakken was a member of Gjøvik municipality council from 1979 to 1983, later serving as deputy mayor from 1991 to 2005.

References

1961 births
Living people
Members of the Storting
Labour Party (Norway) politicians
Politicians from Gjøvik
Norwegian state secretaries
People from Vestre Toten
21st-century Norwegian politicians